On January 17, 2022, the smallest of three ruling constituents in the Parliament of Montenegro, United Reform Action, proposed a potential solution in the form of a minority government, as an answer to the political crisis that has been plaguing the country since the summer of 2021, when the largest ruling constituent, the Democratic Front stepped out, putting the parliament into an effective blockade. The proposed minority government would consist of the United Reform Action, Civis, Socialist People's Party of Montenegro, Bosniak Party, Democratic Party, New Democratic Force, and Albanian Alternative. Even though the parties mentioned have 14 seats in the parliament, Dritan Abazović, the Deputy Prime Minister of Montenegro and the president of the United Reform Action, stated that he expects the support of either the opposition or the ruling parties, or ideally both, and has invited all 81 MPs of the Montenegrin parliament to support the initiative.

Almost immediately after the proposal was made, it was heavily criticized by the Democrats, one of the ruling three constituents of the parliamentary majority, who stated that it is a "pact with the DPS and their former allies, citing the ethnic minority parties. Soon after, the Prime Minister of Montenegro made a proclamation stating that the minority government is a "betrayal". Both subjects accused Dritan Abazović of "betraying the will of the people" as well as of political corruption, and undermining the results of the last parliamentary election.

The proposal caused mixed reactions in the Montenegrin public, some condemning it, while some supporting it. Since January 18, there have been daily protests throughout various towns in Montenegro, against the formation of the minority government and in support of the Krivokapić Cabinet. So far, the protests have been held in Podgorica, Nikšić, Pljevlja, Bijelo Polje, Berane, and Budva. The protest in Podgorica, held on 23 January 2022, was even attended by some of the ministers supporting Krivokapić.

The proposal for the dismissal of the Deputy Prime Minister of Montenegro, Dritan Abazović, which was to be voted on February 3, 2022, failed to pass, as only 20 MPs voted for, 11 against, while 46 abstained from voting altogether, and 4 were absent.

The second proposal, for shortening the term of the current parliamentary assembly, which was supposed be discussed on February 4, 2022, also did not pass, as the majority of the MPs didn't approve of the piece of the daily agenda pertaining to it. The motion of no-confidence towards the cabinet of Zdravko Krivokapić, which was discussed later that same day, had passed, it becoming the first government in the history of Montenegro to lose a no-confidence vote in the parliament. 43 MPs voted for the no-confidence vote, 11 MPs voted against. The other 27 MPs, composed of the  Democratic Front, Socialist People's Party of Montenegro and  DEMOS left the parliament shortly before the vote was conducted.

On 7 February 2022, the bid for the dismissal President of the Parliament of Montenegro, Aleksa Bečić, passed, with 43 votes in favor, 36 against, and two absentees. Henceforth, Strahinja Bulajić, one of the Deputy Presidents of the Parliament was named the acting President of the Parliament until a new one is elected.

On 28 April 2022, the installment of a new cabinet led by Dritan Abazović, passed with 45 votes in favour, 0 against and 36 absentees. Henceforth, Dritan Abazović was elected as the new Prime Minister. On the same day, Danijela Đurović was elected as the new President of the Parliament of Montenegro

See also
2019 Montenegrin anti-corruption protests
2019–2020 clerical protests in Montenegro
Montenegrin nationalist protests (2020–present)
2021 Montenegrin episcopal enthronement protests
2022 Montenegrin pro-government protests

References

Crisis
2022 in Montenegro
2022 protests
Protests in Montenegro
Montenegro 2022